Virgil Gonsalves (September 5, 1931 – October 20, 2008) was an American jazz saxophonist and clarinetist, though primarily a baritone saxophonist.

Career 
Born in Monterey, California, Gonsalves was a baritone saxophonist with the orchestras of Alvino Rey (1950) and Tex Beneke (1952). In 1954, he formed an ensemble with Bob Enevoldsen, the tenor saxophonist Buddy Wise, Lou Levy, Harry Babasin, and Larry Bunker, and recorded the album Virgil Gonsalves Sextet in 1954 on Nocturne Records 8. Among the group's later members were Leo Wright, Junior Mance, Ron Crotty (born 1929), and Eddie Khan. Gonzalves also worked as a freelance musician, mainly in the San Francisco area. He was a member of the Pacific Gas & Electric band from 1971 to 1972. He died in Salinas, California.

Selected discography 
As leader
 Virgil Gonsalves Sextet
 Los Angeles, September 23, 1954, Nocturne
 Virgil Gonsalves (baritone sax), Bob Enevoldsen (vocal, trombone), Buddy Wise (tenor sax), Lou Levy (pianist)|Lou Levy (piano), Harry Babasin (double bass), Larry Bunker (drums)
 Virgil Gonsalves, Jazz – San Francisco Style
 San Francisco, c. 1955, Liberty
 Bob Bagley (vocal, trombone), Danny Pateris (tenor sax), Virgil Gonsalves (baritone sax), Clyde Pound (piano), Ron Crotty (double bass), Max Hartstein (double bass), Gus Gustafson (drums)

As sideman
 Rudy Salvini Orchestra, Intro to Jazz
 San Francisco 1957
 Rudy Salvini, Allen Smith, Al Del Simone, Wayne Allen, Billy Catalano (trumpets), Van Hughes, Archie Lecoque, Chuck Etter, Ron Bertuccelli (trombones), Charles Martin (alto sax), Jerry Coker, Tom Hart, Howard Dudune (tenor sax), Virgil Gonsalves (baritone), John Marabuto (piano), Dean Reilly (double bass),  (drums), Jerry Cournoyer, Jerry Mulvihill, Jerry Coker (arrangers)

As leader
 Virgil Gonsalves, Jazz at Monterey: Virgil Gonsalves Big Band Plus Six
 San Francisco, c. 1959, 1959
 San Francisco, c. 1959

References 

Jazz baritone saxophonists
1931 births
2008 deaths
Cool jazz saxophonists
American jazz baritone saxophonists
Musicians from the San Francisco Bay Area
20th-century American saxophonists
Jazz musicians from California
Buddy Miles Express members